The Pachakuti Indigenous Movement (Spanish: Movimiento Indígena Pachakuti) was an indigenist political party in Bolivia founded in November 2000.

At the legislative elections in 2002, the party won 2.2% of the popular vote and 6 out of 130 seats in the Chamber of Deputies and none out of 27 seats in the Senate. Its candidate at the presidential elections, Felipe Quispe, won 6.1% of the popular vote.

At the legislative elections in 2005, the party won 2.2% of the popular vote and no seats. Its candidate at the presidential elections, Felipe Quispe Huanca, won 2.2% of the popular vote.

See also
Policarpio Castañeta Yujra

References

2000 establishments in Bolivia
2005 disestablishments in Bolivia
Defunct political parties in Bolivia
Defunct socialist parties
Indigenous organisations in Bolivia
Indigenist political parties in South America
Political parties disestablished in 2005
Political parties established in 2000
Socialist parties in Bolivia